The 1988 Tennents' Sixes was the fifth staging of the indoor 6-a-side football tournament. For the third time it was held at the Scottish Exhibition and Conference Centre (SECC) in Glasgow on 24 and 25 January.

There were 4 groups of 3,  with 11 clubs drawn from the 1987–88 Scottish Premier Division season. Rangers did not participate and were replaced by English club Nottingham Forest.

The two group winners and runners-up qualified to the quarter-finals and Dundee beat Motherwell 3–2 in the final.

Group stage

Group 1

Group 2

Group 3

Group 4

Quarter-finals

Semi-finals

Final

References

External links
Scottish Football Historical Archive
Tournament programme

1987–88 in Scottish football
1980s in Glasgow
Tennents' Sixes
Sports competitions in Glasgow
Football in Glasgow
January 1988 sports events in the United Kingdom